The Brâglez (also: Gârbou) is a left tributary of the river Someș in Romania. It flows through the village Gârbou and discharges into the Someș in Surduc.

References

Rivers of Romania
Rivers of Sălaj County